Allobates olfersioides (common name: Rio rocket frog) is a species of frog in the family Aromobatidae. It is endemic to the coastal regions of the Atlantic Forest biome of eastern Brazil.

This formerly very common species has recently declined and is now absent from many historical locations, but remains common in some areas. It is threatened by habitat loss and possibly chytridiomycosis.

The natural habitats of Allobates olfersioides are primary and secondary forests. It is a diurnal frog that lives on the forest floor. Clutch size is up to 11 eggs. Eggs are laid in a terrestrial nest where they hatch. Tadpoles are carried by the parents to puddles or small rivulets where they feed until metamorphosis.

References

olfersioides
Endemic fauna of Brazil
Amphibians of Brazil
Amphibians described in 1925
Taxonomy articles created by Polbot